Sir Adam Beck Hydroelectric Generating Stations are two hydroelectric generating stations in Niagara Falls, Ontario, Canada. Sir Adam Beck Generating Station I, Sir Adam Beck Generating Station II and the Sir Adam Beck Pump Generating Station are all owned by Ontario Power Generation. Following the development of several smaller generating stations around Niagara Falls in the late 19th and early 20th centuries, the Province of Ontario authorized the construction of the first major publicly owned generating station in the province. At the time it was built, it was the largest hydroelectric generating station in the world.

Adam Beck I

Adam Beck I contains 10 generators and first produced power in 1922. It was originally called the Queenston-Chippawa Hydroelectric Plant and was renamed after Adam Beck in 1950 on the twenty-fifth anniversary of his death. The water is diverted through the Chippawa-Queenston Power Canal from the Welland River.

As the first large-scale hydroelectric generation project in the world, Adam Beck I was designated a National Historic Site of Canada in 1990.

Adam Beck II 

Adam Beck II contains 16 generators and first produced power in 1954. The water was first diverted from the Niagara River by two five-mile (8 km) tunnels under the city of Niagara Falls, Ontario, that start above the falls. A reservoir was created that permits the holding of water, diverted during the night, for use during the day.

Between 2006 and 2013, Adam Beck II underwent major civil engineering projects with the addition of a major underground water supply tunnel built by the Niagara Tunnel Project in order to improve its generation output. Water delivered by the major new tunnel complemented other upgrades to the Sir Adam Beck generating complex, resulting in a significant increase to the efficient use of the Niagara River's hydro power.

A CAD 60 million refurbishment of the Pump Generating Station reservoir, built in 1957, was started in 2016.

The major 1965 Northeast Blackout of Ontario and several U.S. states occurred on 9 November, after maintenance personnel incorrectly set a protective relay on one of the transmission lines from the Sir Adam Beck Station No. II. The faulty relay later tripped open causing a major blackout created by a series of cascading failures which affected over 30 million people for up to 12 hours.

Water diversion
The open cut Chippawa-Queenston Power Canal diverts water from the Welland River to the stations. All three tunnel intakes are upstream of the Control Dam, however one of the three tunnels is unseen, under the water, located directly in front of the Control Dam, Control Tower. The open cut canal and the tunnel canal cross at the "Cross Over" where there is a third channel feeding the 174 MW pump generating station  which pumps water up into the man-made reservoir at night and generates electricity during the day, feeding the water back to the Sir Adam Beck Generating Complex.

The International Control Dam, operated by Ontario Power Generation, controls the water diversions from the Niagara River and dispatches the water between the New York Power Authority and Ontario Power Generation in accordance with the terms of the 1950 Niagara Treaty.

This treaty, designed to ensure an "unbroken curtain of water" is flowing over the falls, states that during daylight time during the tourist season (1 April to 31 October) there must be  of water flowing over the falls, and during the night and off-tourist season there must be  of water flowing over the falls. This treaty is monitored by the International Niagara Board of Control.

See also

 Robert Moses Niagara Power Plant
 List of largest power stations in Canada
 List of energy storage projects
 List of Niagara Falls hydroelectric generating plants

References

External links 

 Images of Sir Adam Beck 1 Power Plant Niagara Falls Public Library (Ont.)
 Images of Sir Adam Beck 2 Power Plant Niagara Falls Public Library (Ont.)
 International Niagara Board of Control
 Images of the Queenston-Chippawa Power Canal Niagara Falls Public Library (Ont.)
 Air Curtain Fences Blast, Popular Mechanics, August 1954, pp. 96–97, the delicate controlled blast in 1954 to connect the two reservoirs.

Energy infrastructure completed in 1922
Energy infrastructure completed in 1954
Buildings and structures in Niagara Falls, Ontario
Ontario electricity policy
Hydroelectric power stations in Ontario
Ontario Hydro
Ontario Power Generation
National Historic Sites in Ontario
Pumped-storage hydroelectric power stations
1922 establishments in Ontario